Nuestra Belleza Guanajuato 2011, was held at the Club de Leones of Pénjamo, Guanajuato on July 15, 2011. At the conclusion of the final night of competition, Mariana Berumen of León was crowned the winner. Berumen was crowned by outgoing Nuestra Belleza Guanajuato titleholder Helena Baca. Seven contestants competed for the title.

Results

Placements

Contestants

References

External links
Official Website

Nuestra Belleza México